The 23rd Cavalry Division was a cavalry formation of the United States Army National Guard during the interwar period.

It was created in the early 1920s due to the perceived need for additional cavalry units along with three other National Guard cavalry divisions, but its headquarters was not activated until 1939 as a result of funding shortages.

History 
Constituted in 1921, the division was allocated to Texas, Louisiana, Alabama, Georgia, Tennessee, North Carolina, New Mexico, and Massachusetts as part of the Third Army. Though the division was not formally activated at the time and lacked a headquarters due to funding shortages, the Texas 56th Cavalry Brigade with the 111th (New Mexico) and 112th (Texas) Cavalry Regiments was the first combat unit assigned to the division in June 1921; its commander, Brigadier General Jacob F. Wolters was commanding general of the division for mobilization until his November 1934 retirement. The division headquarters troops was previously organized at Birmingham on 12 April. The hitherto unallocated 55th Cavalry Brigade included the 109th (Tennessee) and 110th (Massachusetts) Cavalry Regiments and was organized throughout the 1920s. By 1927 the 23rd's allocation was reduced to the states of the Fourth and Eighth Corps Areas.

The elements of the division conducted squad and platoon training at their armories and troop, squadron, and brigade training at annual summer camps. The majority of division units from the Fourth Corps Area held summer camp with the 6th Cavalry at Fort Oglethorpe, while the 56th Cavalry Brigade trained at Camp Wolters and the 141st Field Artillery at Camp Beauregard. Due to the concentration of its brigades at summer camps, Regular Army evaluators assessed them as among the best National Guard cavalrymen.

Organization, 1940
The 23rd Cavalry Division was organized at some time after World War I, and was not activated in World War II. Of its component regiments, only the 106th Cavalry Regiment was activated under a cavalry designation during World War II.
 Headquarters (New Orleans, Louisiana)
 Headquarters, Special Troops (New Orleans, Louisiana)
 Headquarters Troop (New Orleans, Louisiana)
 23rd Signal Troop (Birmingham, Alabama)
 127th Ordnance Company (Medium) (Wisconsin National Guard) **
 23rd Tank Company (Light) (Illinois National Guard) ** 
 53rd Cavalry Brigade 
 Headquarters (Madison, Wisconsin)
 Headquarters Troop (Stanley, Wisconsin)
 105th Cavalry Regiment (Nekoosa, Wisconsin)
 106th Cavalry Regiment (Chicago, Illinois)
 55th Cavalry Brigade
 Headquarters (New Orleans, Louisiana
 Headquarters Troop (Birmingham, Alabama)
 108th Cavalry Regiment (Hinesville, Georgia)
 109th Cavalry Regiment (Chattanooga, Tennessee)
 23rd Reconnaissance Squadron (Springfield, Illinois)
 141st Field Artillery Regiment (New Orleans, Louisiana)
 127th Engineer Squadron (Huntsville, Alabama)
 123rd Medical Squadron (Alabama National Guard) *
 123rd Quartermaster Squadron (Illinois National Guard) *

One asterisk indicated the unit was partially organized, with the designated headquarters location for mobilization shown. Two asterisks indicated the unit was allotted, but unorganized or inactive, with the state of headquarters allocation shown.

Stationing
The 23rd Cavalry Division was geographically dispersed across the United States.  The division was composed of personnel from the Alabama, Massachusetts, New Mexico, North Carolina, Tennessee, Texas, & Wisconsin National Guards.

References

Citations

Bibliography 

, The Trading Post, Journal of the American Society of Military Insignia Collectors, April- June 2009, pages 20 & 21

23